Jack Hansen (born 2 October 1947) is a Danish former footballer. He competed in the men's tournament at the 1972 Summer Olympics.

References

External links
 

1947 births
Living people
Danish men's footballers
Denmark international footballers
Olympic footballers of Denmark
Footballers at the 1972 Summer Olympics
Footballers from Odense
Association football midfielders